The ITF Athens Open (previously known as the Vogue Athens Open) was a tournament for professional female tennis players played on outdoor hard courts. The event was classified as a $50,000 ITF Women's Circuit tournament and was held in Athens, Greece, from 2008 to 2010.

Past finals

Singles

Doubles

External links 
 ITF search 

ITF Women's World Tennis Tour
Hard court tennis tournaments
Tennis tournaments in Greece
Sports competitions in Athens
Recurring sporting events established in 2008
Recurring sporting events disestablished in 2010
Defunct sports competitions in Greece
Defunct tennis tournaments in Greece